Polpis (also Milton Poadpis or Podpis) is a village in Nantucket, Massachusetts, United States.  Its elevation is 7 feet (2 m).  The different spellings of its name led the Board on Geographic Names to designate its official spelling in 1900.  The community lies 3.5 miles (5.5 km) northwest of Siasconset.

References

Villages in Nantucket, Massachusetts
Villages in Massachusetts
Populated coastal places in Massachusetts